Bairagee is a 2022 Indian Kannada-language action thriller film directed by Vijay Milton (in his Kannada debut) and produced by Krishna Sarthak. An adaptation of Milton's own Tamil film Kadugu, the film stars Shiva Rajkumar, Anjali, Dhananjay and Pruthvi Ambaar. The music was composed by Anoop Seelin.

Plot 
"Huli" Shivappa and his uncle are Hulivesha artists performing at a function, before Shivappa gets involved in a fight due to someone injuring his uncle. While serving jail time, Shivappa's uncle dies, and Inspector Prakash Sarang teaches him to control his anger and employs him after Shivappa is released. Shivappa also befriends Vaataapi and former boxer and leader of the village, Karna. One day, Vaataapi places a lock on a local music teacher's motorcycle instead of the motorcycle of his love interest Shobina. The teacher notices Shivappa's hesitant help to pay her fine.

On Facebook, Shivappa befriends someone by the name "Deepika Padukone", who is actually the teacher. The two talk, and Shivappa suggests they meet in-person. They meet on a train but don't see each other, instead talking by phone. The teacher explains that she had a troubled upbringing but eventually finished a teacher's training course at age 14 thanks to local politicians, but the local newspaper branded her as a prostitute upon her success. To avoid bringing shame to her family and sister's wedding, she moved to a completely different city where no one knew her. When Karna invites an MLA for an inauguration, the MLA tries to molest a child named Keerti. Karna attempts to intervene, but realizes that his political career could be in jeopardy, so he keeps quiet about the issue. 

The teacher intervenes later, saving Keerthi while being injured in the process. Keerthi is traumatized and withdraws from school. Shivappa learns about the issue and turns on Karna, who is constantly conflicted about his decision. Due to Karna's current standing and lack of proof and complaint, the police doesn't take any action. During a temple worship, Keerthi commits suicide by drowning. The teacher realizes that she has to file a police complaint, which confuses Shivappa and Vaataapi since Keerthi had already died. The teacher goes to the police station to file the complaint, but is taken by the MLA's PA to Karna's celebration venue where Shivappa also arrives. It is revealed through the complaint that after the teacher saved Keerthi from the MLA, the MLA assaulted the teacher. 

Karna and Shivappa fight, but Shivappa bests him and reminds him that it is their duty to protect women. When Shivappa, Vaataapi, and the teacher go to file the police complaint, Inspector Sarang shows them that it is not necessary as Karna is now in prison. Karna explains that while the complaint would have put the MLA behind bars, the teacher's reputation would have been tarnished. Instead, Karna went to the MLA's residence and killed him, thus taking the blame and exacting vengeance for Keerthi's death.

Cast 
 Shiva Rajkumar as Huli Shivappa
 Anjali as a music teacher
 Dhananjay as Karna Vijayagatti, a boxer and local chairman
 Pruthvi Ambaar as Vaataapi
 Yasha Shivkumar as Shobina
 Shashi Kumar as Inspector Prakash Sarang
 Sharath Lohithaswa as Minister
 Vinod Alva as Inspector 
 Baby Saptha Poorvi as Keerthi
 Yamuna Srinidhi as Keerthi's mother
 Kalpana Naganath as Karna's mother 
 Anu Prabhakar in an extended cameo appearance as Rukmini, a folk dancer
 Chikkanna special appearance in "Rhythm of Shivappa".

Soundtrack 
J. Anoop Seelin composed the soundtrack.

Release
The film was theatrically released on 1 July 2022.

Critical reception

References

External links 
 

2022 action drama films
2020s Kannada-language films
Indian action drama films
Kannada remakes of Tamil films